Several Canadian naval units have been named HMCS Nanaimo.
  (I), a Flower-class corvette that served in the Royal Canadian Navy during the Battle of the Atlantic.

Battle honours
Atlantic, 1941–1944.
Gulf of St. Lawrence, 1944.

References
 Directory of History and Heritage - HMCS Nanaimo 

Royal Canadian Navy ship names